Rising Sun Historic District  is a national historic district located at Rising Sun, Ohio County, Indiana.  The district encompasses 322 contributing buildings, 2 contributing sites, and 2 contributing objects in Rising Sun.  It developed between about 1810 and 1955, and includes notable examples of Federal, Italianate, and Classical Revival style architecture. Located in the district are the separately listed Clore Plow Works-J.W. Whitlock and Company buildings.  Other notable contributing resources include the First Presbyterian Church (1843), Ohio County Courthouse (1845), Alexander C. Downey House (c. 1850), Rising Sun Cemetery (aka Union and Soldier's Cemeteries; c. 1810), and Robert E. Covington House (c. 1885).

It was listed on the National Register of Historic Places in 2006.

References

Historic districts on the National Register of Historic Places in Indiana
Federal architecture in Indiana
Italianate architecture in Indiana
Neoclassical architecture in Indiana
Buildings and structures in Ohio County, Indiana
National Register of Historic Places in Ohio County, Indiana